Al-Hadher (transliteration: al-Ḥāḍir) is a village in northern Syria, administratively part of the Mount Simeon District of the Aleppo Governorate. According to the Syria Central Bureau of Statistics (CBS), al-Hadher had a population of 8,550 in the 2004 census. 

It is 4 kilometers east of the ancient town of Qinnasrin (Chalcis ad Belum). It was founded by the Arab tribe of Tanukh as a ḥāḍir (a settlement of sedentarized Bedouin) in the 4th century under Byzantine rule. Al-Hadher served as the headquarters of Jund Qinnasrin, (military district of Qinnasrin).

References

Bibliography

Populated places in Mount Simeon District